Tom McSorley (born Thomas Holland McSorley) is a Canadian film critic and scholar, based in Ottawa, Ontario.

He is the Executive Director of the Canadian Film Institute. He is also  a sessional lecturer in Film Studies, at Carleton University;  a freelance film and former theatre critic for CBC Radio One;  the editor of Rivers of Time: The Films of Philip Hoffman (2008); and co-editor of Self Portraits: The Cinemas of Canada Since Telefilm (2006) and Life Without Death:  The Cinema of Frank Cole (2009). He is the author of numerous articles and book chapters on Canadian and international cinema, and the author of a new critical study on Atom Egoyan’s 1991 feature film, The Adjuster (2009).  In 1997, McSorley created the annual Latin American Film Festival as a key component of the Canadian Film Institute's ongoing international film programming in Canada's capital.  He is also the singer and drummer in the Ottawa-based rock band Presence and his alter ego, Sam Menard, was the drummer for ska rockabilly band The Pelts.

References

"Rivers of Time: The Films of Philip Hoffman" - Canadian Film Institute
"Life Without Death: The Cinema of Frank Cole" - Coach House Books
"Atom Egoyan's The Adjuster" - University of Toronto Press

External links
CBC Ottawa - Ottawa Morning - Film with Tom McSorley
Canadian Film Institute
Presence the Band

Canadian magazine editors
Canadian film critics
People from Ottawa
Academic staff of Carleton University
Canadian radio personalities
Living people
Canadian film educators
Year of birth missing (living people)